The , branded  is a limited express electric multiple unit (EMU) train type operated by the private railway operator Kintetsu Railway in Japan since September 2016. The train was converted from a 6200 series commuter train.

Design
The train was converted from a former 6200 series commuter train built in 1978.

Operations

Formation
The three-car train is formed as follows.

History
The conversion work on the train was completed in July 2016, and the train entered service on 10 September 2016.

References

External links

 Kintetsu "Blue Symphony" information 

Electric multiple units of Japan
16200 series
Train-related introductions in 2016

ja:近鉄16200系電車
1500 V DC multiple units of Japan
Kinki Sharyo multiple units